The Organisation of Marxist–Leninists of Greece, known by its Greek acronym OMLE (ΟΜΛΕ), was the original Greek anti-revisionist Marxist-Leninist political movement, which split from the Communist Party of Greece in 1964, opposing Soviet revisionism.

OMLE emerged from the merger of exiled Greek communist in the former Soviet Union and the other Eastern bloc countries with a Greek communist group which was publishing the magazine  Anagenisi ('Renaissance').

After Mao Zedong's death, in 1976, OMLE came into a major crisis and split in two major parties: Communist Party of Greece (Marxist-Leninist) and the Marxist-Leninist Communist Party of Greece, the latter party following the Three Worlds Theory.

See also
 Communist Party of Greece/Marxist–Leninist

1964 establishments in Greece
1976 disestablishments in Greece

Defunct communist parties in Greece
Anti-revisionist organizations
Stalinist parties
Maoist parties
Far-left politics in Greece
Maoist organizations in Greece
Political parties disestablished in 1976
Political parties established in 1964